Chaillot Papers are monographic publications of various topics issued by the European Union Institute for Security Studies (EUISS). They are written by the EUISS researchers or by external authors commissioned by the EUISS. The Papers can be found at the EUISS website, downloadable in PDF format.

The Chaillot Papers have been issued since 1991, initially by the Institute for Security Studies of the Western European Union.

See also
Adelphi Papers
European Union Institute for Security Studies
European External Action Service
Common Foreign and Security Policy

References

External links

 EUISS Website
 EUISS Publications

Publications of the European Union establishments
Publications established in 1991
Works about politics
1991 establishments in Europe